Ex Tempore is a literary magazine published annually by the United Nations Society of Writers, or in French, Societé des écrivains des Nations Unies. The magazine was started in 1989. The editors seek contributions that are "crisp, impromptu, and as far away as possible from the stale UN jargon of declarations, resolutions and reports." 33 numbers have been issued, including the 180-page anniversary 30th compilation in all UN languages Arabic, Chinese, English, French, Russian and Spanish.  The WHO publication New Special, with a circulation of 10,500 copies, published a two-page article by Sarah Jordan in February 2020 "Happy Anniversary" to mark 30 years of the publication of the literary journal (pp. 40–41). The April 2020 issue of International Diplomat carries an article entitled "30 Years United Nations Society of Writers" (pages 48–49) and notes "UNSW continues to advocate international solidarity in and through our cultural diversity, and would like to be seen as a herald of democracy. Over the centuries many authors and musicians have shared this vision of universal peace, e.g. Immanuel Kant in his famous essay on Perpetual Peace, Hugo von Hofmannsthal and Richard Strauss, who founded the Salzburger Festspiele in 1920 (one hundred years ago!!!) to consecrate music and drama to the task of unifying nations and cultures, expressing the ineffable in music – that highest aesthetic form and vital principle of humanity’s striving for transcendence."

Society of Writers
The Society of Writers was founded on 14 August 1989 by Sergio Chaves of Argentina, Leonor Sampaio of Brazil and Alfred de Zayas of the United States.

Officers
Following the well-attended general assembly of UNSW on 11 November 2020, held per Skype in Geneva, the magazine's officers are:

President: Marko Stanovic
Vice-president: Carla Edelenbos
Secretary: Amos Wama Taporaie
Treasurer: Ivaylo Petrov
Editor-in-chief: Alfred de Zayas
the editorial committee was similarly reelected.

Honorary President:  Tatiana Valovaya, Director-General, United Nations Office in Geneva

After 15 years as president of the Society, de Zayas retired from the position on 15 December 2005, remaining as editor of this literary magazine.

Membership
Membership in the Society of Writers is open to active and retired staff of the United Nations, specialized agencies, CERN, Permanent Missions and Observer Missions, intergovernmental organisations, non-governmental organizations and the press corps. There are about 80 members currently in UNSW.

Editions
Volume 19. Because 2008 was the International Year of Languages Ex Tempore featured languages as its main theme. It included 148 pages with poetry, short stories and drama written by 43 authors in 14 languages, including Latin.
 Volume 20. 160 pages in 13 languages, including Hebrew and Esperanto.
 Volume 21. Dedicated to "music, the international language"; 104 pages (December 2010).
 Volume 22. Dedicated to Jean-Jacques Rousseau; 168 pages (December 2011).
 Volume 23. Dedicated to the Human Right to Peace.
 Volume 24. Dedicated to the Verdi/Wagner bicentennial, swans, cows, love.(158 pages)
 Volume 25. Dedicated to 25 years of UN writers.(184 pages)
 Volume 26. Dedicated to the environment, COP21 and reconciliation.(168 pages)
 Volume 27. Dedicated to the history of poetry and poetic correspondence.(172 pages)
 Volume 28. Covering international day of happiness, music, populism, and an interview with Jean Ziegler (168 pages)
 Volume 29. with essays about law and justice, fake news, fake history, fake law, fake diplomacy, fake democracy and great new poems (168 pages)
 Volume 30. with articles from the essay-writing, poetry and blogging workshops held at the UN library on 27 September 2019 (180 pages).
 Volume 31. with essays, short stories and poetry on confinement, lockdown,the coronavirus and a historical section in Russian devoted to Peter I Romanov  (168 pages).  The UN staff magazine The New Special published an article by Marko Stanovic on the "literature during confinement", reviewing the essays and poems contained in issue Nr. 31. 

 Volume 32. with essays, short stories, poetry and aphorisms, richly illustrated with pictures and a follow-up in Russian devoted to Peter I Romanov  (148 pages).
 Volume 33 with essays, short stories, poetry and aphorisms, many focusing on the Ukraine war and pleading for peace.  This time the photos and illustrations are in colour. (156 pages)

Special events
 On 5 October 2008 Ex Tempore hosted the Mahmoud Darwish memorial lecture, during which poems of the recently deceased Palestinian poet were read out in Arabic, and in English and French translation.
 On 23 January 2009 the magazine hosted the traditional salon, attended by 52 people. The 14th annual salon took place on 22 January 2010, with 73 participants, and the 15th  was on 21 January 2011.
 On 22 January 2010, 14th annual salon
 On 21 January 2011, 15th annual salon.
 On 20 January 2012, 16th annual salon.
 On 28 June 2012, Jean-Jacques Rousseau workshop.
 On 25 January 2013, 17th annual salon.
 On 24 January 2014, 18th annual salon.
 On 14 August 2014, celebration of 25 years UNSW at the Press Bar, Palais des Nations.
 On 14 October 2014, UN Library event on 25 years Ex Tempore.,
 On 23 January 2015 the 19th annual salon was held with 63 poets and essayists attending
 On 22 January 2016 the 20th annual salon was held with 61 participants.
 On 16 November 2016 - conference/concert with Eric Noyer and Marie Neeser
 On 20 January 2017 - 21st annual salon with 54 in the audience and 17 readers.
 On 26 January 2018 - 22nd annual salon with 56 in the audience and 15 readers.
 On 25 January 2019 - 23rd annual salon with 59 in the audience and 14 readers.
 On 27 September 2019 - celebration of the 30th anniversary of the UNSW and Ex Tempore at the UN Library. See Article in the UN Special of November 2019.
 On 24 September 2020 - 24th annual salon with 48 in the audience and 15 readers in English, French, German, Latin, Russian, Spanish and Vietnamese.
 On 27 June 2021 - since the 25th annual salon had to be cancelled because of Covid, a "litterary tea" was held outdoors in the garden, with 15 participants who read in the six UN languages.
 On 25 June 2022 - since the annual salon was cancelled, a second "literary tea" was organized in the fresh air, this time with 16 participants who read in the six UN languages.
 On 27 January 2023 - the regular January salon was revived and a successful 25th annual salon was held with contributions in English, French and Spanish.  25 members of the UNSW participated in the event. An article in the March issue of the UN Staff magazine New Special is devoted to this salon and to women writers of UNSW. www.newspecial.org p. 16

Notable contributors
 Nedd Willard
 David Walters

Reference numbers
,

References

Further reading
 Johannes van Aggelen, "Celebrating Cultural Diversity - Ex Tempore at 20,"  Diva International, Nr. 2/2010, pages 32–33.
 "Célébration des lettres," UN Special, No. 650, April 2006, tenth literary salon of the Society.
 Fête de la Genève Internationale : Diva International 2006/Nr. 2.
 David Winch, "Les Onusiens et la literature", UN Special, February 2005
 Marko Stanovic, "Past, Present and Future". The March 2017 issue of UN Special publishes an article on the history of the Society of Writers.
 Diva International, United Nations Society of Writers celebrates 25 years

External links

1989 establishments in Switzerland
Annual magazines
Magazines established in 1989
Literary magazines published in Switzerland
United Nations mass media